Shi, Duke Kang of Shao (died  1000 BC), or Ji Shi, also known as the Earl of Shao, was a high-ranking minister of the early Zhou dynasty. He was a younger brother of King Wu, the founding king of Zhou. Siding with his half-brother Duke of Zhou, Duke of Shao helped suppress the Rebellion of the Three Guards after King Wu's death.

During the reigns of King Wu's son King Cheng and King Cheng's son King Kang, Duke of Shao held the post of Grand Protector (太保), one of the Three Ducal Ministers.

And he is the ancestor of the rulers of Yan, one of the states in the Warring States era.

References

 

Monarchs of Yan (state)
10th-century BC Chinese people
Zhou dynasty people